Keith Gabel (born July 20, 1984) is a Paralympic snowboarder originally from Ogden, Utah.

Gabel competed for the United States at the 2014 Winter Paralympics and again in 2018. He won silver in 2018 snowboard cross division SB-LL2 and had won bronze in 2014. He became involved in adaptive sports after he lost his foot in 2000. He also won a silver medal in snowboard cross at the 2016–17 IPC Snowboard World Cup. He won silver medal from South Korea at the 2018 Winter Paralympics.

References

External links 
 
 
 Keith Gabel at World Para Snowboard

1984 births
Living people
American male snowboarders
Paralympic snowboarders of the United States
Paralympic silver medalists for the United States
Paralympic bronze medalists for the United States
Paralympic medalists in snowboarding
Snowboarders at the 2014 Winter Paralympics
Snowboarders at the 2018 Winter Paralympics
Snowboarders at the 2022 Winter Paralympics
Medalists at the 2014 Winter Paralympics
Medalists at the 2018 Winter Paralympics
X Games athletes
Sportspeople from Ogden, Utah